Sevodnya (Today) was a liberal-bourgeois evening newspaper published in St. Petersburg, Russia, from 1906 to 1908.

References

Newspapers published in the Russian Empire
Publications established in 1906
Publications disestablished in 1908
Mass media in Saint Petersburg
Defunct newspapers published in Russia
Russian-language newspapers
1906 establishments in the Russian Empire